Dulpod is a Goan dance song with quick rhythm and themes from everyday Goan life. The plural of dulpod in Konkani is dulpodam. The dulpod is a folk song, anonymous, freely improvised, and sometimes lacking in thematic unity. The tunes of the dulpod are usually in the six-eight measure, though the two-fourths are not uncommon. The dulpod is usually sung in sequence with a mando.

Farar-far zatai ranantu is one of the best known , a masterpiece of its genre. The composer sings: “The white soldiers are shooting at the Rane.
Some other  are:

Other famous  are:

See also 
 Deknni
 Mando
 Fugdi
 Collection of Dulpods

Citations

References

External links 

Goan music